Ali Nihat Yazıcı (born 1964) is the head of Turkish Chess Federation.

After graduating from Istanbul Technical University as an electronics and communication engineer in 1987, Yazıcı worked for the Turkish Radio and Television Corporation (TRT) as an engineer. He got an MBA on Business from Middle East Technical University. He graduated from Swiss International Business Academy first with a higher education degree on Radio and Television. He left Ankara University at a thesis level on Radio and Television. He was appointed to TRT Television vice presidency between 1991 and 2001.

Yazıcı is a FIDE International Arbiter and was elected as president to the Turkish Chess Federation as of 18 November 2000.

External links

Chessbase News: 12 October 2007: Ali Nihat Yazici, President of Turkish Chess Federation, sues European Chess Union

1964 births
Living people
Chess officials
Chess arbiters
Chess in Turkey
Istanbul Technical University alumni
Turkish electronics engineers
Middle East Technical University alumni